D-161 is a chemical known in research circles as a triple reuptake inhibitor. Although this compound has lent support to the inclusion of dopamine in the monoamine hypothesis of depression, D-161 has not been tested in clinical trials.

References 

Serotonin–norepinephrine–dopamine reuptake inhibitors